The 1958 Oregon Webfoots football team represented the University of Oregon in the Pacific Coast Conference (PCC) during the 1958 NCAA University Division football season. In their eighth season under head coach Len Casanova, the Webfoots compiled a 4–6 record (4–4 against PCC opponents), finished in fifth place in the PCC, and outscored their opponents, 93 to 50. The team played home games at Hayward Field in Eugene, Oregon and Multnomah Stadium in Portland, Oregon.

The team's statistical leaders included Dave Grosz with 468 passing yards and Willie West with 470 rushing yards and 140 receiving yards.

Schedule

References

Oregon
Oregon Ducks football seasons
Oregon Webfoots football